Sabina Chebichi is a former Kenyan middle-distance runner popularly known as ‘petticoat princess’

Background
Sabina Chebichi was born in 1959 in Trans-Nzoia County, northwest of Nairobi, Kenya. She attended Mlimani Primary School for her early education.

Career
Chebichi started running in 1972, her first race was at Kechiko which she won. When news about a schoolgirl competing without any kit broke out in the media, Feisal Sherman who was Secretary of Kenya's Amateur Athletic Association (now Athletics Kenya) sent her running kit and proper shoes. At 14 years of age, Chebichi became the first Kenyan female athlete to win a medal at the Commonwealth Games in 1974, she won bronze in the 800m Women's race at 2:02.61 mins, she went on to compete in the  Relay and 1500m race.

Sabina Chebichi was named to compete at the 1976 Summer Olympics which were held in Montreal Canada from July 17 to August 1 before her country Kenya boycotted the games along with other African countries. Her career faced a halt when she got pregnant.

See also
List of Commonwealth Games medallists in athletics (women)

References

1959 births
Living people
Kenyan female middle-distance runners
Commonwealth Games bronze medallists for Kenya
Commonwealth Games medallists in athletics
Athletes (track and field) at the 1974 British Commonwealth Games
People from Trans-Nzoia County
Medallists at the 1974 British Commonwealth Games